Slam Dunk Ernest is a 1995 American direct-to-video sports comedy film, and the eighth full-length feature film starring Jim Varney as Ernest P. Worrell.  It was released direct-to-video, and was directed by long-time Ernest collaborator John Cherry. In this film, Ernest joins his employer's basketball team and later becomes a star with the help of an angel (Kareem Abdul-Jabbar). It was the third and final Ernest film to be shot in Vancouver, British Columbia.

Plot summary

Ernest takes a job with a cleaning service at the local mall, and he soon seeks to join his co-workers' basketball team, "Clean Sweep", as they compete in the city league tournament. He is reluctantly accepted by the team, but given only a minor role as their cheerleader and mascot. They start to regret letting Ernest join when he accidentally causes them to lose a game in the last second. In his despair, he is visited by an angel, and given a pair of magical shoes, but is warned, "Don't misuse the shoes." As a matter of fact, the shoe store's owner, Zamiel Moloch happens to be a demon in disguise. He would eventually prevent Ernest's sportsmanship with the basketball players by luring Ernest to arrogance, and Ernest's love interest, Erma Terradiddle, a formerly shy girl into a money-hungry vamp, all in an effort to gain Quincy the son the lead player.

When an injury to a key player leaves the team desperate for a replacement, Ernest is given an opportunity to play. In the process, he discovers that the supernatural shoes have imbued him with super speed and the ability to fly. Armed with these extraordinary abilities, he leads the team to a series of victories leading ultimately to a showdown with the NBA's Charlotte Hornets. As the city league tournament champions, Clean Sweep earns the right to play an exhibition contest against the Hornets, but suffers turmoil as Ernest's teammates soon grow weary of his flagrant over-the-top ball-hogging antics.  All the while Quincy goes to steal a pair of tennis shoes he has had his eyes on.

While Ernest is in the zone and the team does nothing but sit around, Ernest decides to let the team do the work, wash his hands of Moloch and Erma, and get rid of the shoes, in doing so it influences Quincy to return the shoes, but Ernest is needed again and scores (along with causing some mishaps) the game-winning point and the members of the team get drafted into the NBA, after a real agent recognizes Barry's skill.

Cast
 Jim Varney as Ernest P. Worrell
 Kareem Abdul-Jabbar as The Archangel of Basketball
 Jay Brazeau as Mr. Zamiel Moloch
 Louise Vallance as Miss Erma Terradiddle
 Cylk Cozart as Barry Worth
 Miguel A. Núñez Jr. as T.J.
 Aaron Joseph as Quincy

Home media
Originally released on VHS on June 20, 1995, a LaserDisc release was also planned for the same year, but later cancelled. This film had its first DVD release on June 10, 2003 from Touchstone Home Entertainment. Lions Gate Entertainment re-released it on March 23, 2007. Disney re-released it as part of the Ernest 2-Movie Collection along with Ernest Goes to Jail on February 10, 2008. Image Entertainment re-released it as part of Ernest's Wacky Adventures: Volume 2 along with Ernest Goes to School, Ernest Goes to Africa and Hey Vern, It's My Family Album on June 5, 2012.

References

External links 
 

1995 films
1995 direct-to-video films
1990s sports comedy films
American basketball films
Ernest P. Worrell films
Films directed by John R. Cherry III
American sports comedy films
1995 comedy films
Films shot in Vancouver
1990s English-language films
1990s American films